Roy Albert DeMeo (September 7, 1940 – January 10, 1983) was an Italian-American mobster in the Gambino crime family of New York City. He headed a group referred to as the "DeMeo crew", which became notorious for the large number of murders they committed and for the grisly way they disposed of the bodies, which became known as "the Gemini Method". The crew is believed to be responsible for up to 200 murders, many of which were committed by DeMeo himself.

Early life 
Roy Albert DeMeo was born on September 7, 1940 in Flatlands, Brooklyn, to a working-class Italian immigrant family of Neapolitan origin. The fourth of five children of Eleanor (a housewife) and Anthony DeMeo (a laundry company deliveryman), DeMeo graduated from James Madison High School in 1959, during which time he began earning money as a loanshark. The economist Walter Block and future presidential candidate Bernie Sanders were among his graduating year classmates. Between the ages of fifteen and twenty-two, he also worked at a local grocery store, where he trained as an apprentice butcher. Roy's older brother Anthony Frank "Chubby" DeMeo, a U.S. Marine Corps corporal, was killed in action during the Korean War on April 23, 1951, aged twenty. His father died of a heart attack on December 12, 1960 when Roy was nineteen, and his mother subsequently returned to Italy with Roy's youngest brother to live with relatives near Naples.

Criminal career

Gambino family
Roy DeMeo was initially an associate of the Flatlands–Canarsie faction of the Lucchese crime family, which controlled tow truck companies, junkyards, and car theft operations in that section of Brooklyn. Anthony Gaggi, a soldier in the Gambino crime family, noticed DeMeo in 1966 and told him that he could make even more money with his successful business if he came to work directly for the Gambinos. Through the late 1960s, DeMeo's organized crime prospects increased on two fronts. He continued in the loansharking business with Gaggi, and began developing a crew of young men involved in car theft. It was this collective of criminals that became known both in the underworld and in law enforcement circles as the DeMeo crew.

The first member of the DeMeo crew was 16-year-old Chris Rosenberg, who met DeMeo in 1966 when he was dealing marijuana at a Canarsie gas station. DeMeo helped Rosenberg increase his business and profits by loaning him money so that he could deal in larger amounts. By 1972, Rosenberg had introduced his friends to DeMeo and they began working for him as well. The additional members of the crew came to include Joseph and Patrick Testa, Anthony Senter, Richard and Frederick DiNome, Henry Borelli, Joseph "Dracula" Guglielmo (DeMeo's cousin), and later, Vito Arena and Carlo Profeta. DeMeo joined a Brooklyn credit union that same year, gaining a position on the board of directors shortly afterward. He utilized his position to launder money earned through his illegal ventures. He also introduced colleagues at the credit union to a lucrative side-business, laundering the money of drug dealers he had become acquainted with. DeMeo also built up his loansharking business with funds stolen from credit union reserves.

DeMeo's collection of loanshark customers, while still primarily those in the car industry, soon included other businesses such as a dentist's office, an abortion clinic, restaurants and flea markets. He was also listed as an employee for a Brooklyn company named S & C Sportswear Corporation, and frequently told his neighbors he worked in construction, food retailing and the used car business. Bonanno underboss Salvatore Vitale claimed to the FBI that in 1974 he was ordered to deliver the corpse of a man who had just been murdered to a garage in Queens so that it could be disposed of by DeMeo.

In late 1974, a conflict that had erupted between the DeMeo crew and Andrei Katz, a young auto repair shop owner who was partners with DeMeo in a stolen car ring, had continued to escalate. In January 1975, Katz visited the Brooklyn District Attorney's Office and voluntarily provided them information that Chris Rosenberg was heavily involved in auto theft. DeMeo learned about the meeting immediately after it happened from an Auto Crimes detective on his payroll. Roy ordered DeMeo crew associate Henry Borelli to contact a female acquaintance, Babette Judith Questel, about being used as bait. In May, Katz  appeared before a Brooklyn grand jury and divulged what he knew about the DeMeo crew's illegal activities.

On June 13, 1975, Questel was used to successfully lure Katz to her Manhattan apartment complex for what he thought was a date, where upon arrival he was immediately abducted by members of the DeMeo crew. He was then taken to the meat department of a supermarket in Rockaway Beach, Queens, where he was stabbed multiple times in the heart and then the back by a butcher knife. After being decapitated, Katz's head was then crushed when it was put through a machine normally used for compacting cardboard boxes. The body parts were wrapped in plastic bags and then deposited into the supermarket's dumpster, where they were discovered days later when a pedestrian walking his dog spotted one of Katz's legs lying on a curb near the store. The police reported to the press that a grisly, brutal killing had occurred, but that was the extent of the information given. The body was identified as that of Andrei Katz two days later through the use of dental records.

Gemini Method
As the 1970s continued, DeMeo cultivated his followers into a crew experienced with the process of murdering and dismembering victims. With the exception of killings intended to send a message to any who would hinder their criminal activities, or murders that presented no other alternative, a set method of execution was established by DeMeo and crew to ensure that victims would be dispatched quickly and then made to disappear. The style of execution was dubbed the "Gemini Method", after the Gemini Lounge, the primary hangout of the DeMeo crew, as well as the site where most of the crew's victims were killed.

The process of the Gemini Method, as revealed by multiple crew members and associates who became government witnesses in the early 1980s, was to lure the victim through the side door of the lounge and into the apartment in the back portion of the building. At this point, a crew member (almost always DeMeo according to crew-member-turned-government-witness Frederick DiNome) would approach with a silenced pistol in one hand and a towel in the other, shooting the victim in the head then wrapping the towel around the victim's head wound like a turban to stanch the blood flow. Immediately after, another member of the crew (originally Chris Rosenberg, up until his 1979 murder, according to government witness testimony) would stab the victim in the heart to prevent more blood from pumping out of the gunshot wound. By then, the victim would be dead, at which point the body would be stripped of clothing and dragged into the bathroom, where the remaining blood drained out or congealed within the body. This was to eliminate the messiness of the next step, when crew members would place the body onto plastic sheets laid out in the main room and proceed to dismember it, cutting off the arms, legs and head.

The body parts would then be put into bags, placed in cardboard boxes and sent to the Fountain Avenue Dump in Brooklyn. So many tons of garbage were dropped each day at the dump that it would be nearly impossible for the bodies to be discovered. During the initial stages of an early 1980s federal/state task force targeting the DeMeo crew, a plan by authorities to excavate sections of the dump to locate remains of victims was aborted when it was deemed too costly and unlikely to locate any meaningful evidence. The landfill, opposite the Starrett City Apartment Complex on Pennsylvania Avenue in the heavily African-American East New York section of Brooklyn, across the Belt Parkway, was closed in 1985, and capped over since, all signs (and odors) that a landfill had existed gone, replaced by a parkland.

Some victims were killed in other ways for varying reasons. At times, suspected informants or those who committed an act of disrespect against a member of the crew or their superiors had their bodies left in the streets of New York to serve as a message and warning. There were also occasions where it would not be possible to lure the intended victim into the Gemini Lounge, in which case other locations would have to be used. A cabin cruiser owned by Richard DiNome was used on at least one occasion to dispose of remains.

Further criminal career
In the latter half of 1975, DeMeo became a silent partner in a peep show/prostitution establishment in Bricktown, New Jersey after the owner of the business became unable to pay his loansharking debts. DeMeo also began dealing in bestiality and child pornography, which he sold to his New Jersey establishment as well as connections he had in Rhode Island. When Gaggi found out about DeMeo's involvement in such taboo films, he ordered DeMeo to stop under the threat of death. However, DeMeo defied Gaggi and continued the practice. Gaggi did not retaliate, and, according to his nephew, Dominick Montiglio, the subject was never mentioned again as long as DeMeo continued making payments to Gaggi. DeMeo also dealt in narcotics despite the Gambino family strictly forbidding such activity; he financed a major operation importing Colombian marijuana, which was unloaded from an offshore freighter and sold at various auto shops in Canarsie, and also sold cocaine out of the Gemini Lounge.

As 1975 drew to a close, DeMeo was the subject of Internal Revenue Service (IRS) investigations into his income. Months earlier, the Boro of Brooklyn Credit Union had been pushed into insolvency as a result of DeMeo and his colleagues' plundering of its finances. As a result, DeMeo quit the Credit Union. Before an indictment could be handed down against him, he utilized false affidavits from businesses owned by friends and acquaintances claiming he was on their payrolls as an employee. These affidavits served to account for some of his income, allowing him to reach a settlement with the IRS.

DeMeo's sources of income, as well as his crew, continued to grow. By July 1976, DeMeo added an automobile firm by the name of Team Auto Wholesalers to his loanshark customers. The owner of Team Auto, Matthew Rega, also purchased stolen vehicles from the crew and sold them off at a New Jersey car lot that he owned. He also involved himself with hijacking delivery trucks from John F. Kennedy International Airport. His crew now included Edward "Danny" Grillo, a hijacker who had just been released from prison.

In the fall of 1976, the Gambino family went through a massive change when its boss Carlo Gambino died of natural causes. Paul Castellano was named the boss, with Aniello Dellacroce retaining the position of underboss. The implications of this were twofold for DeMeo. Gaggi was elevated to the position of caporegime, taking over the crew of men Castellano previously headed. This promotion was beneficial for DeMeo, whose mentor was now even closer to the family leadership. Another advantage was that with Gambino deceased, new associates would be eligible for membership into the family.

Castellano did not immediately "open the books" for new members, opting instead to promote existing members and shuffle around the crews' leaders. He also allegedly opposed the idea of DeMeo being made. Castellano involved himself in white-collar crime and looked down on street-level members such as DeMeo. Additionally, Castellano felt DeMeo was uncontrollable. Gaggi's attempts at persuading Castellano to make DeMeo were continually rejected. By 1977, DeMeo became distraught by this situation and searched for opportunities that would ensure larger returns for his superiors.

The Westies alliance and Rosenberg
DeMeo secured his induction into the Gambino family by forming an alliance with an Irish-American gang known as the Westies. The leader of a rival Irish gang, Mickey Spillane, was causing delays for the construction of the Jacob K. Javits Convention Center, much to the frustration of Gambino boss Paul Castellano, who had a part in the project. After the unsolved murder of Spillane in May 1977, Westies leader James Coonan assumed control of the Irish mob rackets on the West Side of Manhattan. DeMeo, sensing an opportunity to create a vast source of income for the Gambino family, persuaded Gaggi to consider a partnership with the Westies. Shortly afterwards, Coonan and his second-in-command Mickey Featherstone were called to a meeting with Castellano, in which they agreed to become a de facto arm of the Gambino family and share ten percent of all profits. In exchange, the Westies would be privy to several lucrative union deals and take on murder contracts for the family.

It was his pivotal role in the Westie/Gambino alliance that reportedly convinced Castellano to give DeMeo his "button", or formally induct him into the family. DeMeo was made in mid-1977 and put in charge of handling all family business with the Westies. He was ordered to get permission before committing any murders and to avoid drug dealing. DeMeo's crew, however, continued to sell large amounts of cocaine, marijuana, and a variety of narcotic pills. DeMeo also continued to commit unsanctioned killings, such as the 1977 double homicide of Johnathan Quinn, a car thief suspected of cooperating with law enforcement, and Cherie Golden, Quinn's 19-year-old girlfriend. DeMeo's crew dumped the bodies in locations where they would be discovered to serve as a warning against cooperation with authorities.

In 1978, Frederick DiNome, previously DeMeo's chauffeur, joined the crew. DeMeo and his crew murdered Edward Grillo, who had fallen into heavy debt with DeMeo and was believed to be becoming susceptible to police coercion. Grillo, who was dismembered and disposed of like many of the crew's murder victims, was the first known occurrence of internal crew discipline.

The next member to be killed was Rosenberg, who had set up a drug deal with a Cuban man living in Florida and then murdered him and his associates when they traveled to New York to complete the sale. The Cuban had connections with a Cuban drug cartel, raising the possibility of violence between the Gambino family and the Cubans unless Rosenberg was dealt with. DeMeo was ordered to kill Rosenberg but stalled for weeks. During this period, DeMeo committed his most public murder. The victim was a college student with no criminal ties named Dominick Ragucci, who was paying for his tuition as a door-to-door salesman. DeMeo saw Ragucci parked outside his Massapequa Park, Long Island house and assumed he was a Cuban assassin. DeMeo and crew members Joseph Guglielmo and Freddy DiNome pursued Ragucci in a seven-mile car chase on Route 110 through Amityville and Farmingdale, after which the student was shot to death by DeMeo. After returning home and gathering his family, DeMeo drove them out of Long Island and left them at a hotel in upstate New York for two weeks. According to DeMeo's son Albert, he started crying when he discovered he had murdered an innocent teenager and did not eat for several days afterwards. The public execution of Ragucci also put a strain on DeMeo's relationship with his wife Gladys, who had previously been able to ignore her husband's criminal activities.

Gaggi was infuriated by the murder of Ragucci, and ordered DeMeo to kill Rosenberg before there were any other innocent victims. On May 11, 1979, Rosenberg reported to the Gemini clubhouse for the crew's usual Friday night meeting. Shortly after his arrival, DeMeo quickly fired a single bullet into the unsuspecting Rosenberg's head. The usually ice-cold DeMeo hesitated when the still-living Rosenberg managed to rise off the floor to one knee, but Anthony Senter then moved in and finished him off with four shots to the head. Unlike Grillo, Rosenberg's body was not dismembered or made to disappear. The Cubans had demanded that his murder make the newspapers. DeMeo's men placed Rosenberg's body in his car and left it on the side of Cross Bay Boulevard, near the Gateway National Wildlife Refuge in Broad Channel, Queens to be found. Albert DeMeo later recounted that Rosenberg's murder affected his father deeply, and that when DeMeo came home after the killing, he went into his study room and didn't come out for two days. After Rosenberg's murder, DeMeo spent six weeks hiding out with Guglielmo in a safe house near 42nd Street in Times Square, Manhattan, growing a full beard and disguising himself with a baseball cap and sunglasses when out in public.

Empire Boulevard operation
As 1979 continued, DeMeo began to expand his business activities, in particular his auto theft operation, which soon became the largest in New York City's history. Dubbed the Empire Boulevard Operation by Federal Bureau of Investigation (FBI) agents, the operation consisted of hundreds of stolen cars being shipped from the port of Newark, New Jersey to Kuwait and Puerto Rico. DeMeo put together a group of five active partners in the operation, all of whom earned approximately $30,000 a week each in profit. Aside from stolen automobiles, DeMeo was also shipping cigarettes and pornographic magazines to the Middle East.

Aside from the active partners, other associates and crew members performed the actual stealing of the automobiles off the streets of New York. Among these associates was Vito Arena, a long-time car thief and armed robber who began working for DeMeo in 1978 after murdering his old partner. Like DiNome, Arena became closely involved with the DeMeo Crew by the end of the 1970s. In 1979, the scheme was nearly stopped by a legitimate car dealer who threatened to inform the police. He was murdered along with an uninvolved acquaintance before he could provide law-enforcement authorities with information.

Eppolito murders
In late 1979, DeMeo and Nino Gaggi became involved in a conflict with James Eppolito and James Eppolito Jr., two made Gambino members in Gaggi's crew. They were the paternal uncle and cousin, respectively, of a corrupt former New York City Police Department (NYPD) detective, Louis Eppolito, whose father, Ralph, brother of James Sr., was also a made member of the Gambino family.

James Eppolito met with Paul Castellano and accused DeMeo and Gaggi of drug dealing, which carried the penalty of death. Castellano, to whom Gaggi was a close ally, sided against Eppolito in the situation and gave Gaggi permission to do what he pleased. He and DeMeo shot the two to death in Eppolito Jr.'s car en route to the Gemini Lounge on October 1, 1979. A witness driving by right as the shots were fired within the parked car managed to alert a nearby police officer, who arrested Gaggi after a shootout between the two that left Gaggi with a bullet wound in his neck. Since DeMeo had split up with Gaggi as they left the scene, he was not arrested or identified by the witness. Gaggi was charged with murder and the attempted murder of a police officer but through jury tampering was convicted only of assault and given a 5 to 15-year sentence in federal prison. DeMeo murdered the witness shortly after Gaggi's sentencing in March 1980.

The Empire Boulevard Operation had continued to expand through 1979 and 1980 until the warehouse serving as its headquarters was raided by agents from the Newark branch of the FBI in the summer of 1980. The FBI had been surveilling the warehouse and some of the men unloading vehicles there and had shortly thereafter obtained a search warrant. Henry Borelli and Frederick DiNome were arrested in May 1981 for their roles in the operation, but there was not enough evidence to arrest any of the other active partners. DeMeo ordered Borelli and DiNome to plead guilty to the charges in hopes that it would stop any further investigations into his activities by the FBI or other law enforcement agencies.

Downfall and murder

By 1982, the FBI was investigating the enormous number of missing and murdered persons who were linked to DeMeo or who had last been seen entering the Gemini Lounge. Around this time an FBI bug in the home of Gambino family capo Angelo Ruggiero picked up a conversation between Ruggiero and Gene Gotti, a brother of John Gotti. In the conversation, it is discussed that Paul Castellano had put out a hit on DeMeo, but was having difficulty finding someone willing to do the job. Gene Gotti mentions that his brother, John, was wary of taking the contract, as DeMeo had an "army of killers" around him. It is also mentioned in this same secretly recorded conversation that, at that time, John had killed fewer than 10 people, while DeMeo had killed 37 that they had known about. According to mob turncoat Sammy Gravano, eventually the contract was given to Frank DeCicco, but DeCicco and his crew could not get to DeMeo either. DeCicco allegedly handed the job to DeMeo's own men.

DeMeo's son Albert wrote that in his final days, DeMeo was paranoid and knew that he would be killed soon. In his final days, DeMeo was seen wearing a leather jacket, with a shotgun concealed underneath. DeMeo considered faking his own death by having his son shoot him and laying low. On January 10, 1983, DeMeo went to crew member Patty Testa's house for a meeting with his men. That night, he failed to attend his daughter Dione's birthday party, which caused his family to be suspicious. Albert DeMeo later found Roy's personal belongings such as his watch, wallet, and ring in his study room, and a Catholic pamphlet. Ten days later, on January 20, DeMeo's Cadillac Coupe DeVille was discovered in the parking lot of the Varuna Boat Club in Sheepshead Bay, Brooklyn. The car was towed to a nearby police station where it was searched by Organized Crime Control Bureau detectives. DeMeo's partially frozen body was found in the trunk with a chandelier on top of it. He had been shot multiple times in the head and had a bullet wound in his hand, assumed by law enforcement to be a reflexive defensive wound caused when his killers opened fire on him.

The task force investigating the DeMeo crew theorized that DeMeo was set up in a similar manner to how he set up Rosenberg, and that Gaggi, Testa and Senter were present when he was killed. In April 1984, Colombo crime family soldier Ralph Scopo was overheard explaining to an associate that DeMeo had been killed by his own family because they merely suspected that he would not be able to stand up to legal charges that resulted from his stolen car ring. According to Scopo, Castellano also "had to put (DeMeo) away" because he "was crazy and had cast-iron balls". Albert DeMeo believed that his father was killed by members of his own crew. Anthony "Gaspipe" Casso claimed that Castellano ordered John Gotti and Frank DeCicco to kill DeMeo, but they were unable to get close to him. DeCicco suggested Casso could do it, as he knew Anthony Senter and Joseph Testa well. Casso ordered them to kill DeMeo, assuring them that there would be no retribution and that afterwards they would be with him in the Lucchese family. DeMeo visited the home of Patty Testa to collect some money he was owed. Joey Tester and Senter were both there. As DeMeo sat down and waited for a coffee, they shot him dead.

Ironically, according to Casso, Castellano ordering DeMeo's execution sealed his own fate, as Gotti and DeCicco were planning to kill him, and would do so on December 16 1985. Casso said they would never have dared to move against Castellano while DeMeo was still alive.

Aftermath 
In 1984, a 78 count indictment was filed against 24 defendants including the surviving members of the DeMeo crew, capo Nino Gaggi, and Gambino crime family head Paul Castellano. The charges related to auto-theft, racketeering, and drug trafficking. Paul Castellano was indicted for ordering the murder of DeMeo, as well as a host of other crimes, but was killed in December 1985 while out on bail in the middle of the first trial. The murder was ordered by John Gotti, who thus became the new boss of the Gambino family. After the death of Castellano, Nino Gaggi became the lead defendant but he too soon died later of natural causes. In March 1986, six were found guilty, with Henry Borelli and other person found guilty of two counts of murder. They were found guilty of murdering two people who threatened to expose the car theft ring. In June 1989, nine additional members, including Anthony Senter and Joseph Testa, were found guilty. At sentencing, Senter and Testa were given life sentences for murder with an additional 20 years for racketeering. Prosecutor William Mack Jr. said "The Roy DeMeo Crew is the most violent crew ever prosecuted in federal court, as far as my knowledge" and saying DeMeo "engaged in wholesale slaughter".

The convictions were secured in large part by testimony of former members Frederick DiNome and Dominick Montiglio, as well as Vito Arena. Montiglio turned when he learned there was a contract on his life, and was placed in the witness protection program for 20 years for his testimony. Richard DiNome was killed in 1984. Frederick DiNome later died in what was ruled as a suicide. Vito Arena left New York in 1989 after serving 6 years of an 18-year sentence after his testimony. He was killed in a 1991 robbery in Texas. The Gemini Lounge later became a storefront church.

DeMeo is the subject of the 1992 book Murder Machine by Jerry Capeci and Gene Mustaine. Roy DeMeo's son Albert also wrote a book about his life growing up called For the Sins of My Father, published in 2002. DeMeo is portrayed by Michael A. Miranda in the 2001 film Boss of Bosses. Ray Liotta plays DeMeo in the 2012 film adaptation of Anthony Bruno's book about Richard Kuklinski, The Iceman: The True Story of a Cold-Blooded Killer.

Personal life 

Roy DeMeo married Gladys Rosamond Brittain (February 13, 1939 – September 7, 2002) in 1960.  In 1966, DeMeo moved into a custom-built home in Massapequa, Long Island, where he lived with his wife and three children. The couple had two daughters and a son. DeMeo was raised Catholic, but stopped practicing the religion in later life; his children were raised in his wife's Lutheran faith. By all accounts, he was a devoted family man. Describing growing up, Roy's son Albert DeMeo said "I grew up in a very normal household."

Albert DeMeo became a stockbroker, but had a nervous breakdown after the release of Murder Machine in 1992. He was later diagnosed with post-traumatic stress disorder. One of Roy's daughters became a clothing designer, and the other one a medical doctor.

List of murders committed by the DeMeo crew

References

Further reading
 Abadinsky, Howard. Organized Crime. 5th Edition, Chicago: Nelson-Hall, 1997
 O'Brien, Joseph. Boss of Bosses: The Fall of the Godfather: The FBI and Paul Castellano. NY: Dell, 1992.
 Raab, Selwyn. The Five Families: The Rise, Decline & Resurgence of America's Most Powerful Mafia Empire. New York: St. Martins Press, 2005.

External links
 Roy Albert DeMeo Federal Bureau of Investigation Records
 Mobsters: Roy DeMeo - Full Episode (S2, E1) | A&E
 My father the mobster - Albert DeMeo, The Guardian
 Albert DeMeo: “For The Sins of My Father” - The Diane Rehm Show

1940 births
1983 deaths
1983 murders in the United States
20th-century American criminals
American drug traffickers
American male criminals
Burials at St. John's Cemetery (Queens)
Catholics from New York (state)
Criminals from Brooklyn
Deaths by firearm in Brooklyn
DeMeo Crew
DeMeo Crew victims
Gambino crime family
Gangsters from New York City
James Madison High School (Brooklyn) alumni
Mafia hitmen
Male murder victims
Murdered American gangsters of Italian descent
People from Flatlands, Brooklyn
People from Massapequa, New York
People murdered in New York City
People of Campanian descent